The San Antonio Bronchos were a minor league baseball team based in San Antonio, Texas, that played in the South Texas League (1903–1906) and Texas League (1907–1919). The team was also known as the Mustangs (1903–04), Warriors (1905), and Aces (1919).

The team won two league championships. The first was in the South Texas League in their inaugural season of 1903, under the guidance of manager Wade Moore. They won their second in 1908, while a member of the Texas League under managers George Leidy and Pat Newnam.

On July 23, 1907, the Bronchos lost a game played to the Austin Senators at Riverside Park in Austin by a 44–0 score, when they made a farce of the second game of a doubleheader, after forfeiting the first game over disagreements with the umpire.

Season records
South Texas League

 In 1904, the league started as Class D, then became Class C on June 15.
Source: 

Texas League

 In 1918, the league suspended operations on July 7.
Source:

League leaders
 1903: Orth Thomas – wins (22)
 1905: Earle Gardner – average (.306)
 1908: Edward Conrad Collins – runs (113)
 1909: Fred Winchell – strikeouts (264)
 1910: Otto McIvor – runs (87); George Stinson – home runs (11, tied); Harry Ables – strikeouts (325)
 1911: Frank Metz – home runs (22)
 1912: Frank Metz – average (.323), hits (171), home runs (21)
 1913: Dave Davenport – strikeouts (204, tied)
 1915: Emmett Munsell – wins (25)
 1916: John Baggan – runs (90, tied)
 1917: John Baggan – runs (102); Roy Leslie – home runs (18)

See also
 :Category:San Antonio Bronchos players
 San Antonio Bears (succeeding Texas League team)

References

Further reading
 

Baseball teams established in 1903
Baseball teams in San Antonio
Defunct Texas League teams
Defunct baseball teams in Texas
Sports clubs disestablished in 1919
1903 establishments in Texas
1919 disestablishments in Texas
Baseball teams disestablished in 1919
Texas-Southern League teams